CEWC-Cymru (Council for Education in World Citizenship-Wales) was an educational charity working with young people to promote global citizenship in Wales.

It was established in 1943 and was based at the Temple of Peace, Cardiff. It worked with schools, colleges and youth groups throughout Wales.

CEWC-Cymru merged with the Welsh Centre for International Affairs in 2014 and ceased to be a separate charity.

References

External links
 CEWC-Cymru website (archived)

Education in Cardiff
Charities based in Wales
Children's charities based in the United Kingdom
Education in Wales